Garve is a village on the Black Water river, in Ross-shire, and is in the Highland Council area of Scotland.

The village is served by the Garve railway station, on the Kyle of Lochalsh Line, which crosses the A835 road on a level crossing.  In 1890 Garve was proposed as the starting-point of a railway to Ullapool.  The village has a primary school and a post office, but no shop. The village is within the Garve and District Community Council area.

Garve and District are served by the Garve and District Development Company, a company formed by the community during 2017.

Climate

References

Populated places in Ross and Cromarty